Daniel Leo may refer to:
 Daniel Leo (rugby union), Samoan rugby player
 Daniel Leo (mobster) (born 1941), American mobster
 Daniel Leo (footballer) (born 2001), Swiss footballer
 Dan Leo (born 1950), Australian politician